The FL5 (until 2012 FR5) is a regional rail route.  It forms part of the network of the Lazio regional railways, which is operated by Trenitalia, and converges on the city of Rome, Italy.

The route operates over the infrastructure of the Pisa–Livorno–Rome railway.  Within the territory of the comune of Rome, it plays the role of a commuter railway. It is estimated that on average about 40,000 passengers travel on an FR5 train each day.

The designation FL5 appears only in publicity material (e.g. public transport maps), in the official timetables, and on signs at some stations. The electronic destination boards at stations on the FL5 route show only the designation "R5" for that route.

Route 

  Civitavecchia ↔ Roma Termini

The FL5, a radial route, runs from the west coast at Civitavecchia in a south easterly direction, via the Pisa–Livorno–Rome railway, to Roma San Pietro, and then around the southern side of Rome's city centre to Roma Termini.

Stations 
The stations on the FL5 are as follows:
 Roma Termini        
 Roma Tuscolana 
 Roma Ostiense  
 Roma Trastevere 
 Roma San Pietro 
 Roma Aurelia (limit of urban service)
 Maccarese-Fregene
 Torre in Pietra-Palidoro
 Palo Laziale
 Ladispoli-Cerveteri
 Marina di Cerveteri
 Santa Severa
 Santa Marinella
 Civitavecchia

See also 

 History of rail transport in Italy
 List of railway stations in Lazio
 Rail transport in Italy
 Transport in Rome

References

External links
 ATAC – official site 
 ATAC map – schematic depicting all routes in the Rome railway network

This article is based upon a translation of the Italian language version as at September 2012.

Ferrovie regionali del Lazio